Benjamin Agyeman-Badu (born 2 October 1998) is a former professional English footballer who plays as a winger. He holds a joined British and Ghanaian nationality.

Career
Born in UK capital London, Benjamin Agyeman-Badu played with youth-team of Blackpool In the season 2014–15 he played on loan at Ryan FC as scholar. In summer 2015 he returned to Blackpool youth team. In 2016 he was part of Blackpool scholars While with Blackpool youth team, he also played as full-back. In 2016 he became senior by playing simultaneously with Blackpool's reserves team. The records mention him in a number of naming variants, from fullname Benjamin Agyeman-Badu, to Benjamin Agyemang-Badu, Benjamin Agyeman, Benjamin Badu, Ben Agyeman or Ben Badu.

In summer 2017 he left England and joined Serbian club FK Sloboda Užice.

On 25 August 2018, Agyeman-Badu made his league debut for Slovenian Second League side Ankaran.

Personal life
In April 2020, Agyeman-Badu was charged with attempted murder and possession of a firearm with intent to endanger life. He and his two co-defendants were remanded in custody. On 15 August 2022, Agyeman-Badu was jailed for thirteen years.

References

1998 births
Living people
Footballers from Greater London
English footballers
English expatriate footballers
Association football wingers
Blackpool F.C. players
FK Sloboda Užice players
Serbian First League players
Expatriate footballers in Serbia
Expatriate footballers in Slovenia
NK Ankaran players
Slovenian Second League players
English people of Ghanaian descent
Black British sportsmen
English prisoners and detainees
Prisoners and detainees of England and Wales
Sportspeople convicted of crimes